Gascoigne (pronounced, and sometimes spelt, Gascoine or Gascoyne) is a British surname of Old French origin, the regional name of Gascony.  The surname first appears on record in England in the early 13th century.  Gascoigne or Gascoine may refer to:

People
Sir Alvary Gascoigne (1893–1970), British diplomat
Bamber Gascoigne (1935–2022), English broadcaster and author
Bamber Gascoigne, fictional character in Charles Lamb's Essays of Elia (essay on Christ's Hospital)
Ben Gascoigne (1915–2010), New Zealand-born Australian optical astronomer and photometrist
Sir Bernard Gascoigne (Bernardo Guasconi, 1614–1687), Italian military adventurer and diplomat
Bianca Gascoigne (born 1987), English model
Cara Gascoigne (1888-1984), British physical educator, coach
Caroline Leigh Gascoigne (1813-1883), British writer
Charles Gascoigne (1738–1806), English industrialist, arms manufacturer and entrepreneur in Russia
George Gascoigne (c.1535–1577), English poet
Jill Gascoine (1937–2020), English actress and novelist
John Gascoigne (disambiguation)
Sir Julian Gascoigne (1903–1990), British Army general, governor of Bermuda
Marc Gascoigne (born 1962), English games author and editor
Marguerite J. Gascoigne, pseudonym of Marguerite Lazarus, née Jackson (1916–2004), British writer
Paul Gascoigne (born 1967), English footballer
Phil Gascoine (1934–2007), British comics artist
Rosalie Gascoigne (1917–1999), New Zealander-Australian artist
Richard Gascoigne (1579–1661x64), English antiquarian
Sheryl Gascoigne (born 1965), British television personality
Stephen Gascoigne ("Yabba") (1878–1942), Australian sports personality
Thomas Gascoigne (disambiguation)
William Gascoigne (disambiguation)

Gascoigne may also refer to:
Oliver Gascoigne, Irish family
Gascoigne baronets of Yorkshire, England

See also
Gascoigne Bluff, Georgia, USA
Gascoigne Road, Hong Kong
Gascoyne (disambiguation)
Gascoigne (film), a film about footballer Paul Gascoigne

French-language surnames